Peter C. Schwartzkopf (born January 15, 1955) is an American politician and the Speaker of the Delaware House of Representatives. A member of the Democratic Party, he has represented the 14th district since 2002. His district covers Rehoboth Beach, Lewes, and Dewey Beach, and he is the only Democrat in the Delaware General Assembly from Sussex County. He served as Majority Leader of the House (2009-2013) before being elected Speaker in 2013.

Electoral history
In 2002, Schwartzkopf won the general election with 4,530 votes (53.1%) against Republican nominee Michael A. Meoli and Libertarian nominee Everett M. Wodiska.
In 2004, Schwartzkopf won the general election with 8,396 votes (67.8%) against Republican nominee Mary Spicer and Libertarian nominee Everett M. Wodiska.
In 2006, Schwartzkopf won the general election with 6,610 votes (69.2%) against Republican nominee Kirk A. Pope Jr. and Independent nominee Maurice J. Barros.
In 2008, Schwartzkopf was unopposed in the general election, winning 10,616 votes.
In 2010, Schwartzkopf won the general election with 6,425 votes (53.7%) against Republican nominee Christopher J. Weeks.
In 2012, Schwartzkopf won the general election with 8,250 votes (89.9%) against Libertarian nominee Margaret V. Melson.
In 2014, Schwartzkopf was unopposed in the general election, winning 5,911 votes.
In 2016, Schwartzkopf won the Democratic primary with 1,868 votes (73.9%) against Don R. Peterson. He went on to win the general election with 9,297 votes (63.6%) against Republican nominee James Louis DeMartino.
In 2018, Schwartzkopf won the general election with 8,530 votes (62.5%) in a rematch against Republican nominee James Louis DeMartino.

See also
John Kowalko
Valerie Longhurst
John C. Atkins

References

External links 
 Vote Smart bio

1955 births
21st-century American politicians
American state police officers
Living people
Democratic Party members of the Delaware House of Representatives
People from Rehoboth Beach, Delaware
Politicians from Philadelphia
Speakers of the Delaware House of Representatives
Wilmington University alumni